Clément Davy (born 17 July 1998) is a French cyclist, who currently rides for UCI WorldTeam .

He also competes in track cycling, and rode in the individual pursuit at the 2019 UCI Track Cycling World Championships.

Major results

Road

2017
 1st  Time trial, National Junior Road Championships
 3rd Overall Trophée Centre Morbihan
 4th Chrono des Nations Juniors
2019
 3rd Chrono des Nations
 6th Chrono Champenois
2020
 10th Time trial, UEC European Under-23 Road Championships

Track
2016
 National Junior Track Championships
1st  Team pursuit
2nd Individual pursuit
2nd Points race
2017
 National Track Championships
1st  Team pursuit
2nd Scratch
2018
 3rd Scratch, UCI World Cup, Hong Kong

Grand Tour general classification results timeline

Notes

References

External links

1998 births
Living people
French track cyclists
French male cyclists
Sportspeople from Hyères
Cyclists from Provence-Alpes-Côte d'Azur